Smail-aga Čengić (1780 – 23 September 1840) was an Ottoman Bosnian lord (with the title of aga) and general in the Ottoman Army. In 1831–32, Čengić was one of the Ottoman generals that fought against Husein Gradaščević, who was leading a rebellion in Bosnia against the central Ottoman government.

Čengić was killed by Novica Cerović as revenge for killing the younger brother of the Prince-Bishop of Montenegro, Petar II Petrović-Njegoš. His death inspired the 1846 epic poem The Death of Smail-aga Čengić by Ivan Mažuranić.

Early life 

The Čengić family originates from Eğil, in present-day Turkey. Smail's father's name was Ibrahim. Smail was born in 1778 or 1780 in the village of Jelašce in the Sanjak of Bosnia, 35 km from Kalinovik (in modern-day Bosnia and Herzegovina). His father died when he was young.

1809–1813
As a junior officer and young general he fought against Serb insurgents between 1809 and 1813, during the First Serbian Uprising and the uprising in Egypt from 1809 to 1810.

1814–?
Around 1814, Smail-aga came to Gacko and settled in area of Cernica, then Tower of Fazlagić, and finally in Lipnik near Havtovac. Here in Lipnik he established his residence and official captaincy, by building a Tower of Čengić, a small mosque and several residential buildings. He also built several captaincy towers in the wider region of Gacko and Eastern Herzegovina, as well as many villas and houses in Mala Gračanica, Srdjevci, Lukavica, Fojnica and Cernica.

1835
In 1835, Smail-aga and the pasha of Pljevlja agreed to murder the Drobnjak Serbian Orthodox priest Milutin Cerović; he was killed by the Turks in the centre of the town, and beheaded. Milutin's son Novica, who was the leading Drobnjak chieftain, denounced the Ottomans alongside his fellow tribal chiefs.

East Herzegovina (1836–1838)

In 1836, on Montenegro's northern border with Herzegovina, Serb tribesmen around the town of Grahovo, who were still feudatories of the Muslim ruler of Herzegovina, refused to pay the haraç (tax for non-Muslims). Recognizing the need for outside assistance, the tribesmen declared that they were subjects of Petar II Petrović Njegoš and thus invoked the support of Montenegro. Determined to crush this insubordination, Ali-paša Rizvanbegović, the vizier of Mostar, launched an assault against Grahovo at the beginning of August 1836. When the town fell to the Ottomans, the vizier ordered his forces to seize captives and to burn the town to the ground. As honor demanded, the Montenegrins, under the command of Njegoš's brother Joko and eight close kinsmen, gathered several hundred men to launch a counter-attack in an attempt to rescue the captives. Although initially successful in rescuing the local clan leader and his followers, the Montenegrins were quickly overrun by the cavalry of feared Ottoman commander Smail-aga Čengić while they skirmished with the combined forces of Rizvanbegović and Ali-paša Resulbegović of Trebinje. In total, nine members of the Petrović-Njegoš clan perished in the battle, and it is believed that Smail-aga personally killed Njegoš's teenage brother, Joko. During the confrontation, the teenager was hacked to death by the Ottomans along with forty other warriors. Čengić had Joko's severed limbs placed on display.

With the tribesmen of Grahovo being forced to take an oath of loyalty to the Ottomans in order to be permitted by them to return to their homes, and thus being forced to not avenge the death of the Montenegrins, including that of Njegoš's own brother, the young Prince-Bishop's hopes of quick revenge were squandered. News of the defeat at Grahovo soon spread abroad and in 1837 Njegoš was forced to travel to St. Petersburg to defend his behavior before the Russians. In 1838, Montenegro, under Russian pressure, signed a peace treaty with the Ottomans. The treaty, however, brought about the briefest of pauses as the clashes and beheadings continued soon afterwards.

Death
Four years after the Montenegrin defeat at Grahovo, seeking revenge for the death of his brother, Njegoš plotted the assassination of Smail-aga with the assistance of the local Christians from Herzegovina who lived on the territory under Smail-aga’s control. Njegoš ordered a Montenegrin tribal leader, Novica Cerović, to ambush Smail-aga Čengić, the Ottoman commander who was responsible for killing Njegoš's brother Joko.

In late September 1840, Montenegrins attracted Čengić and his army deep into their territory, organized an ambush and killed them by attacking their camp during the night. The assault occurred in the village of Mljetičak, north of Nikšić. In the ensuing clash, Smail-aga was shot and killed, after which his severed head was brought to Cetinje. As a sign of his gratitude, Njegoš made Cerović a senator. The events are richly attested in Serb epic poetry.

Governorship
mütesellim of [the nahiyah of] Gacko, Piva and Drobnjak.

Legacy

In folklore
Smail-aga Čengić is described by Ivan Mažuranić in his 1846 epic poem The Death of Smail-aga Čengić published in the almanac Iskra, as a major figure. However, his description of Smail-aga is very "biased and hypocritical", according to contemporary Austrian folklorist F. S. Krauss, and this poem does not show Čengić as he really was.

Krauss writes pretty harshly: 

Vuk Stefanović Karadžić was contemporary of Smail, and he met him several times on his journeys across Bosnia and Herzegovina. Contrary to Ivan Mažuranić, Vuk Karadžić wrote quite positively about Smail-aga Čengić. For Vuk he wasn't just personification of Ottoman authority, instead primarily Smail was Bosnian Slav with tremendous prestige, respectability and influence among Bosnian Slavs, not only of Islamic but also Christian religious affiliation.

As Čengić's acquaintance Vuk Karadžić wrote more positive picture:

Further reading
 Safvet beg Bašagić: "Najstariji ferman begova Čengića" (Glasnik bos.-herc. muzeja Vol. IX. (1897) Sarajevo 1897.
 Safvet beg Bašagić: "Kratka uputa u prošlost Bosne i Hercegovine" Sarajevo 1900.
 Ivan Franjo Jukić as Slavoljub Bošnjak: "Zemljopis i povjesnica Bosne" Zagreb 1851.
 Dragović Marko: "Borba Crnogoraca s Turcima oko prevlasti nad Grahovom" (Starine XX.) Zagreb 1888.
 Dragović Marko: "Materijali za istoriju Crne Gore" (Glasnik srp. učen. društva vol. 63). Beograd 1885.
 I. T. T—D.: "Boj na Mljetičku" (Naše Doba" 1894.) 
 Vuk Stefanović Karadžić: "Srpske narodne pjesme" (Knjiga IV.) Beograd 1896. 
 Magazin srpsko-dalmatinski za ljeto 1845. Zadar 1845. 
 Martinović: "Jakov Daković" (Čupićeva godiš. III.) Beograd 1879. 
 Dr. L. Tomanović: "Petar II. Petrović Njegoš" Cetinje 1896. 
 Article in Sarajevo magazine "Nada" 1898.

Notes

References

External links
 "Hrvatsko kolo" book IV (1908)
 Excerpt from the book "Dinarska putovanja - Kulturne i slike prirode iz Bosne i Hercegovine" by Dr. Moric Hernes, Beč, 1894.
 Smail-aga Čengić Portrait
 Death of Smail-aga Čengić

1780s births
1840 deaths
19th-century Ottoman military personnel
Bosnian Muslims from the Ottoman Empire
Bosnia and Herzegovina soldiers
Ottoman generals
Ottoman military personnel killed in action